"(If Loving You Is Wrong) I Don't Want to Be Right" is a song written by Stax Records songwriters Homer Banks, Carl Hampton, and Raymond Jackson.  Originally written for The Emotions, it has been performed by many singers, most notably by Luther Ingram, whose original recording topped the R&B chart for four weeks and rose to number 3 on the Billboard Hot 100 in 1972. Billboard ranked it as the No. 16 song for 1972.

In 1972–73, The Faces recorded the song as an outtake for Ooh La La (1973), their final studio album. In 1974, Millie Jackson released her version of the song which received two Grammy Award nominations. In 1978, Barbara Mandrell's version topped the U.S. country chart, reached number 31 on the Billboard Hot 100 (number 27 Cashbox), and was nominated for Single of the Year at the 1979 CMA (Country Music Association) Awards. Rod Stewart recorded the song for Foot Loose & Fancy Free (1977), his eighth album; as a single it peaked at number 23 on the UK Singles Chart in 1980.

Content
The song is about an adulterous love affair, told from the point of view of either the mistress or the cheating spouse, depending on the gender of the performer.  Regardless, both parties involved express their desire to maintain the affair, while at the same time acknowledging that the relationship is wrong according to conventional moral standards.

Millie Jackson, however, took a somewhat different approach. On both studio and live recordings, her version is typically divided into three parts: "(If Loving You Is Wrong) I Don't Want to Be Right", "The Rap", and "(If Loving You Is Wrong) I Don't Want to Be Right (Reprise)", which together have a running time of over 11 minutes. The first and third parts include the song more or less as originally written, while the second part was written by Jackson herself. Titled "The Rap", the middle segment is a monologue in which an unrepentant Jackson discusses her status as the "other woman" and why she loves it.

Notable performers
It was first recorded by The Emotions (but their version has never been released), and by Veda Brown, whose version was finally released in 2008.  Other notable singers to cover it include: country singer Jackie Burns (whose version made Hot Country Songs in 1972), Isaac Hayes, Millie Jackson, Rod Stewart, Percy Sledge, Bobby "Blue" Bland, David Ruffin, Barbara Mason, LeAnn Rimes, Renée Geyer, Ramsey Lewis, jazz chanteuse Della Reese, reggae singers Alton Ellis, George Faith and Glen Washington, Tom Jones, Cassandra Wilson, Nathan Cavaleri, Rania Zeriri, Barbara Mandrell and Johanne Desforges (French cover: Si je ne peux t'aimer a quoi bon exister).

In 2020, electronic musician Nicolas Jaar (under his moniker Against All Logic) released his own version called "If Loving You Is Wrong" from his second album 2017-2019, which heavily samples Ingram's version, notably the chorus.

Chart recordings

Luther Ingram

Jackie Burns

Millie Jackson

Barbara Mandrell

Year-end charts

Rhonda Clark

References

External links
 
 
 

1972 singles
1976 singles
1979 singles
Millie Jackson songs
Rod Stewart songs
Renée Geyer songs
Barbara Mandrell songs
Songs written by Homer Banks
Songs written by Raymond Jackson (songwriter)
Song recordings produced by Tom Collins (record producer)
Soul ballads
ABC Records singles
1972 songs
Songs about infidelity
Songs written by Carl Hampton